Daniel Pineda (born August 6, 1985) is an American mixed martial artist who competes in the Featherweight division of the Ultimate Fighting Championship. A professional competitor since 2007, he has also competed for the Professional Fighters League, Bellator, and EliteXC.

Background
Born in Dallas and raised in Waller, Texas, Pineda wrestled in high school for three years before he began training in mixed martial arts at 21.

Mixed martial arts career

Legacy Fighting Championship
Pineda was the Featherweight Champion of Legacy Fighting Championship. None of his fights with Legacy went to decision with notable wins over fighters such as WEC veteran Frank Gomez. Pineda's fights with Legacy Fighting Championships were always exciting and his last fight with Legacy Fighting Championships before he went to the UFC ended in a TKO by spinning backfist at Legacy Fighting Championships 9.

Ultimate Fighting Championship
In early January 2012, it was announced that Pineda had been signed to the UFC.

He made his debut on January 20, 2012, at UFC on FX: Guillard vs. Miller against fellow UFC newcomer Pat Schilling.  Pineda won the fight via submission in the first round.

Pineda faced Mackens Semerzier on March 3, 2012, at UFC on FX 2, replacing an injured Robbie Peralta.  He won the fight via triangle armbar in the first round.

Pineda faced Mike Brown on May 26, 2012, at UFC 146. Pineda lost the bout via unanimous decision.

Pineda faced Antonio Carvalho on July 21, 2012, at UFC 149, replacing an injured George Roop. Pineda lost the fight after he was knocked out for the first time in his professional MMA career.

Pineda returned after a layoff to face Justin Lawrence on April 13, 2013, at The Ultimate Fighter 17 Finale. Pineda won the fight via submission in the first round, earning Submission of the Night honors for his performance.

Pineda faced Diego Brandão on August 17, 2013, at UFC Fight Night 26 He lost the back-and-forth fight via unanimous decision.

Pineda faced Robert Whiteford on March 15, 2014, at UFC 171. He lost the fight via unanimous decision, and was subsequently was released from the UFC.

Return to Legacy FC
Following his UFC release, Pineda re-signed with Legacy Fighting Championships in July 2014.

Pineda faced Leonard Garcia at Legacy FC 37 on November 14, 2014. He won the fight via submission in the first round.

Pineda next faced Thomas Webb at Legacy FC 39 on February 28, 2015. He won the fight via submission early in the first round.

Return to Bellator MMA
After nearly a six-year absence, Pineda returned to the Bellator MMA promotion in 2016.  He faced Emmanuel Sanchez on the main card at Bellator 149 on February 19, 2016.  He lost the fight by unanimous decision.

Pineda faced Mark Dickman at Bellator 161 on September 16, 2016. He won the fight via submission in the third round.

Pineda faced Georgi Karakhanyan at Bellator 182 on August 25, 2017. He lost via doctor stoppage in the second round due to a cut.

Professional Fighters League 
Pineda joined Professional Fighters League (PFL) in 2019 and fought Movlid Khaybulaev and Jeremy Kennedy at PFL. He won both of the bouts on the same night; however it was ruled no contest after Pineda failed a drug test and was subsequently suspended and fined $12,500 by NAC.

Return to the UFC 
Pineda re-signed with UFC in June 2020.

Pineda faced Herbert Burns on August 15, 2020, at UFC 252. He won the fight via technical knockout in round two. This win earned him the Performance of the Night award.

Pineda faced Cub Swanson on December 12, 2020, at UFC 256. He lost the fight via knockout in the second round.

Pineda faced  Andre Fili on June 26, 2021, at UFC Fight Night 190. Early in round two, Pineda was accidentally poked in the eye and was deemed unable to continue. The fight was declared a no contest.

A urine sample Pineda produced on fight night tested positive for amphetamine, a banned substance under the NAC rules. As a result, Pineda was handed a nine-month suspension Wednesday, retroactive to the positive test. He was also fined a total of $2,554.38, accounting for the violation and subsequent legal fees.

Pineda was scheduled to face Jamall Emmers on May 14, 2022, at UFC on ESPN 36. However, the bout was scrapped in late April due to unknown reasons.

Pineda is scheduled to face Tucker Lutz on March 25, 2023, at UFC on ESPN 43.

Personal life
Pineda and his wife have a daughter, Olivia (born 2020).

Championships and accomplishments

Mixed martial arts
Ultimate Fighting Championship
Submission of the Night (One time) vs. Justin Lawrence 
Performance of the Night (One time) .
Legacy Fighting Championship
Legacy FC Featherweight Championship (One time)
Two successful title defenses
Fury FC
Fury FC Interim Featherweight Championship (One time)
Fury FC Lightweight Championship (One time)
Katana Cagefighting
KC Featherweight Championship (One time)

Mixed martial arts record

|-
| NC
|align=center|27–14 (3)
|Andre Fili
|NC (accidental eye poke)
|UFC Fight Night: Gane vs. Volkov 
|
|align=center|2
|align=center|0:46
|Las Vegas, Nevada, United States
|
|-
|Loss
|align=center|27–14 (2)
|Cub Swanson
|KO (punches)
|UFC 256
|
|align=center|2
|align=center|1:52
|Las Vegas, Nevada, United States
|
|-
|Win
|align=center|27–13 (2)
|Herbert Burns
|TKO (elbows)
|UFC 252 
|
|align=center|2
|align=center|4:37
|Las Vegas, Nevada, United States
|
|-
| NC
|align=center|26–13 (2)
|Jeremy Kennedy
|rowspan=2|NC (overturned)
|rowspan=2 | PFL 8
|rowspan=2 | 
|align=center| 1
|align=center| 4:00
|rowspan=2 | Las Vegas, Nevada, United States
|
|-
| NC
|align=center|26–13 (1)
|Movlid Khaybulaev
|align=center| 1
|align=center| 0:29
|
|-
| Win
| align=center|26–13
| Rey Trujillo
| TKO (strikes)
| Fury FC 32
| 
| align=center| 1
| align=center| 3:33
| Humble, Texas, United States
|
|-
| Win
| align=center|25–13
| Elias Rodriguez
| Submission (guillotine choke)
| Fury FC 28
| 
| align=center| 1
| align=center| 0:51
| Humble, Texas, United States
| 
|-
| Win
| align=center|24–13
| Dimitre Ivy
| Submission (triangle choke)
| Fury FC 25
| 
| align=center| 1
| align=center| 1:10
| Humble, Texas, United States
|
|-
| Win
| align=center|23–13
| Josh Davila
| TKO (punches)
| LFA 35
| 
| align=center| 2
| align=center| 0:58
| Houston, Texas, United States
|
|-
| Loss
| align=center|22–13
| Georgi Karakhanyan
| TKO (doctor stoppage)
| Bellator 182
| 
| align=center| 2
| align=center| 4:05
| Verona, New York, United States
|
|-
| Win
| align=center|22–12 
| Mark Dickman
| Submission (rear-naked choke)
| Bellator 161
| 
| align=center| 3
| align=center| 2:07
| Cedar Park, Texas, United States
|
|-
| Loss
| align=center|21–12 
| Emmanuel Sanchez
| Decision (split)
| Bellator 149
| 
| align=center| 3
| align=center| 5:00
| Houston, Texas, United States
|
|-
|Win  
|align=center|21–11 
|Jonny Carson 
|Submission (kimura)
|Legacy FC 41
| 
|align=center|3
|align=center|1:45
|Tulsa, Oklahoma, United States
|
|-
|Win  
|align=center|20–11 
|Thomas Webb
|Submission (triangle choke)
|Legacy FC 39
| 
|align=center|1
|align=center|0:49
|Houston, Texas, United States
|
|-
|Win  
|align=center|19–11 
|Leonard Garcia 
|Submission (kimura)
|Legacy FC 37
| 
|align=center|1
|align=center|1:54
|Houston, Texas, United States
|
|-
|Loss
|align=center|18–11
|Robert Whiteford
|Decision (unanimous)
|UFC 171
|
|align=center|3
|align=center|5:00
|Dallas, Texas, United States
|
|-
|Loss
|align=center|18–10
|Diego Brandão
|Decision (unanimous)
|UFC Fight Night: Shogun vs. Sonnen
|
|align=center|3
|align=center|5:00
|Boston, Massachusetts, United States
|
|-
|Win
|align=center|18–9
|Justin Lawrence
|Submission (kimura)
|The Ultimate Fighter: Team Jones vs. Team Sonnen Finale
|
|align=center|1
|align=center|1:35
|Las Vegas, Nevada, United States
|
|-
|Loss
|align=center|17–9
|Antonio Carvalho
|KO (punches)
|UFC 149
|
|align=center|1
|align=center|1:11
|Calgary, Alberta, Canada
|
|-
|Loss
|align=center|17–8
|Mike Brown
|Decision (unanimous)
|UFC 146
|
|align=center|3
|align=center|5:00
|Las Vegas, Nevada, United States
|
|-
|Win
|align=center|17–7
|Mackens Semerzier
|Submission (triangle-armbar)
|UFC on FX: Alves vs. Kampmann
|
|align=center|1
|align=center|2:05
|Sydney, Australia
|
|-
|Win
|align=center|16–7
|Pat Schilling
| Submission (rear-naked choke)
|UFC on FX: Guillard vs. Miller
|
|align=center|1
|align=center|1:37
|Nashville, Tennessee, United States
|
|-
|Win
|align=center|15–7
|Gilbert Jimenez
|TKO (spinning backfist)
|Legacy FC 9
|
|align=center|2
|align=center|1:37
|Houston, Texas, United States
|
|-
|Win
|align=center|14–7
|Frank Gomez
|Submission (rear-naked choke)
|Legacy FC 7
|
|align=center|3
|align=center|2:25
|Houston, Texas, United States
|
|-
|Win
|align=center|13–7
|Ray Blodgett
|KO (punch)
|Legacy FC 6
|
|align=center|1
|align=center|0:58
|Houston, Texas, United States
|
|-
|Win
|align=center|12–7
|Levi Forrest
|Submission (heel hook)
|Legacy FC 5
|
|align=center|1
|align=center|2:49
|Houston, Texas, United States
|
|-
|Win
|align=center|11–7
|Reynaldo Trujillo
|Submission (rear-naked choke)
|Legacy Promotions
|
|align=center|1
|align=center|1:58
|Houston, Texas, United States
| 
|-
|Loss
|align=center|10–7
|Chas Skelly
|Submission (kneebar)
|Bellator 19
|
|align=center|2
|align=center|2:16
|Grand Prairie, Texas, United States
|
|-
|Win
|align=center|10–6
|James King
|TKO (punches)
|KOK 8: The Uprising
|
|align=center|1
|align=center|4:30
|Austin, Texas, United States
|
|-
|Win
|align=center|9–6
|Douglas Frey
|Submission (heel hook)
|SWC 9: Redemption
|
|align=center|2
|align=center|1:55
|Frisco, Texas, United States
|
|-
|Loss
|align=center|8–6
|Chas Skelly
|Submission
|SWC 8: Night of Rumble
|
|align=center|1
|align=center|2:12
|Frisco, Texas, United States
|
|-
|Loss
|align=center|8–5
|Johnny Bedford
|Submission (triangle choke)
|SWC 7: Discountenance
|
|align=center|2
|align=center|2:58
|Frisco, Texas, United States
|
|-
|Loss
|align=center|8–4
|Kyle Miers
|Submission (rear-naked choke)
|International Xtreme Fight Association
|
|align=center|1
|align=center|1:24
|Vinton, Louisiana, United States
|
|-
|Loss
|align=center|8–3
|Roberto Vargas
|Decision (unanimous)
|Bellator 6
|
|align=center|3
|align=center|5:00
|Robstown, Texas, United States
|
|-
|Win
|align=center|8–2
|Johnny Bedford
|Submission (kneebar)
|SWC 3: St. Valentine's Day Massacre
|
|align=center|1
|align=center|2:00
|Frisco, Texas, United States
|
|-
|Win
|align=center|7–2
|Ira Evanson
|Submission (armbar)
|Katana Cagefighting
|
|align=center|2
|align=center|1:22
|Robstown, Texas, United States
|
|-
|Loss
|align=center|6–2
|Scott Bear
|Submission (choke) 
|Legacy FC 2
|
|align=center|2
|align=center|N/A
|Baton Rouge, Louisiana, United States
|
|-
|Win
|align=center|6–1
|Vince Libardi
|TKO (punches)
|South Coast Promotions
|
|align=center|1
|align=center|1:13
|Houston, Texas, United States
|
|-
|Win
|align=center|5–1
|John Alvarez
|TKO (punches) 
|Katana Cagefighting
|
|align=center|2
|align=center|2:04
|Robstown, Texas, United States
|
|-
|Win
|align=center|4–1
|Warren Stewart	
|TKO (punches) 
|Urban Rumble Championships 1
|
|align=center|1
|align=center|1:42
|Pasadena, Texas, United States
|
|-
|Loss
|align=center|3–1
|Lim Jae-Suk
|Submission (rear-naked choke)
|EliteXC: Renegade
|
|align=center|1
|align=center|2:42
|Corpus Christi, Texas, United States
|
|-
|Win
|align=center|3–0
|Kierre Gooch
|Submission (choke) 
|Renegades Extreme Fighting	
|
|align=center|2
|align=center|0:59
|Houston, Texas, United States
|
|-
|Win
|align=center|2–0
|Warren Stewart
|Submission (rear-naked choke)
|Art of War 2
|
|align=center|1
|align=center|2:00
|Austin, Texas, United States
|
|-
|Win
|align=center|1–0
|Jeremy Mahon
|Submission (rear-naked choke)
|IFC: Caged Combat
|
|align=center|1
|align=center|1:03
|Corpus Christi, Texas, United States
|

See also
List of current UFC fighters
List of male mixed martial artists

References

External links
 
 

American male mixed martial artists
Featherweight mixed martial artists
Mixed martial artists utilizing wrestling
Mixed martial artists utilizing Brazilian jiu-jitsu
Mixed martial artists from Texas
1985 births
Living people
Sportspeople from Dallas
Sportspeople from Houston
Ultimate Fighting Championship male fighters
Doping cases in mixed martial arts
American sportspeople in doping cases
American practitioners of Brazilian jiu-jitsu
People awarded a black belt in Brazilian jiu-jitsu